Christine P. Barber is a member of the Massachusetts House of Representatives. Barber sworn in January 2015. A resident of Somerville, Massachusetts, she was elected as a Democrat to represent the 34th Middlesex district. Barber is a former health care policy analyst and a member of the Somerville Democratic Committee.

See also
 2019–2020 Massachusetts legislature
 2021–2022 Massachusetts legislature

References

Democratic Party members of the Massachusetts House of Representatives
Politicians from Somerville, Massachusetts
Living people
Women state legislators in Massachusetts
21st-century American politicians
21st-century American women politicians
Year of birth missing (living people)